Achim Stoia (Mohu, 1910 – Iași, 1973) was a Romanian composer.

References

1910 births
1973 deaths
20th-century classical composers
Romanian classical composers
Place of birth missing
Male classical composers
20th-century male musicians